20 Minute Workout is a Canadian-produced aerobics-based television program that ran from 1983 to 1984, in which "a bevy of beautiful girls" demonstrated exercise on a rotating platform.

Series background
20 Minute Workout was created by Ron Harris in 1983, produced by Tantra Entertainment in association with the Canadian animation company Nelvana, and broadcast locally on Citytv. In the United States, it was syndicated by Orion Television. Two seasons of the program were produced, although reruns continued to appear for many years afterwards. The first season featured a different instructor for each day of the week, Monday through Friday. Bess Motta, Arlaine Wright, Holly Butler, Nicole Nardini, and Anne Schumacher all had speaking roles.  The second season featured only Bess and Arlaine as instructors. One selling point of the show was the young attractive women exercising in leotards. The exercise routines were demanding, high-impact aerobics, followed by a stretching section. Pulsating music from synthesizers played in the background, although in the first season bass and electric guitar and saxophone were also used in the exercise music scores.  For the first season, music was performed by the group Shiva, while the second season featured music by the trio Jermyn/King/Ouillet.

There are numerous websites hosted by fans that detail about the dancers, and include so-called screen-captures from the show. The :20 Minute Workout is a spin-off from Aerobicise, a series of home videos that were first released in 1981, which had varying subtitles of "The Beginners Workout," "The Ultimate Workout," and "The Beautiful Workout." In 1982, a series of segments aired in the U.S. on Showtime as unscheduled filler in between features, and lasting no longer than five minutes. Both the videos and the filler featured a different cast, and unlike the show they later spawned, exercise instruction was either kept minimal, or not featured at all, and any that was present was given by an off-screen narrator. The narrator was Jami Allen, one of the show's producers.

"Aerobicise" is also the name of the original 1982 pilot episode of 20 Minute Workout.

Scenes from the show are visible on televisions in some scenes of 1984's Friday the 13th: The Final Chapter, Beat Street, Sesame Street Presents: Follow That Bird and the 1994 Luc Besson film Leon: The Professional.

Cast

First season
 Sharon Bisset
 Laurie Briscoe
 Holly Butler
 Sue Carter
 Bess Motta
 Nicole Nardini
 Anne Schumacher
 Leslie Smith
 Arlaine Wright

Second season
 Michelle Brimacombe
 Ella Collins
 Sharon Hasfal
 Alison Hope
 Nerise Houghton
 Bess Motta
 Anne Schumacher 
 Arlaine Wright

References

External links 
 

Citytv original programming
Exercise television shows
1983 Canadian television series debuts
1984 Canadian television series endings
1983 American television series debuts
1984 American television series endings
Television series by MGM Television
Television series by Nelvana
1980s Canadian sports television series